Arbor Drugs was a chain of drug stores based in Troy, Michigan.

It was founded by Eugene Applebaum in 1974, when five stores owned by Applebaum were re-named after his Ann Arbor-based store. In 1986, the chain went public, opening on NASDAQ under the stock symbol ARBR. Through the years, the chain grew, by opening stores and acquiring rival chains, such as Sentry Drugs in 1986 and M&R in 1994. By 1998, the chain held a 45% market share in the Detroit area.

In 1979, the chain was one of the first to offer computerized prescriptions, and by 1989, the entire chain's records were linked together. By 1994, half the chain's sales were pharmacy-related.

A scandal broke out in July 1993 when it was revealed that the chain had overcharged the health insurance company Blue Cross and Blue Shield Association at least $17 million in prescriptions since 1988. The two sides later settled for $15 million, but only one year later, Arbor was once again involved in a controversy over overcharging Medicaid claims. Eventually, all charges, both criminal and civil, were dropped.

By 1997, the drug store chain was the nation's eighth largest, having 207 locations throughout southeastern Michigan. In 1997, revenues totaled $962.8 million.

CVS Corporation announced on February 9, 1998, that it would be purchasing Arbor Drugs in a transaction estimated at $1.48 billion, and creating the largest chain drug retailer in the process. Although most Arbor Drug locations were converted to CVS, several of these stores were later shuttered by the CVS Corporation.

References

American companies established in 1974
Retail companies established in 1974
Defunct pharmacies of the United States
Companies based in Troy, Michigan
Retail companies disestablished in 1998
Defunct companies based in Michigan
1974 establishments in Michigan
CVS Health
Health care companies based in Michigan
1998 disestablishments in Michigan
1998 mergers and acquisitions